Ahmet Cebe (born 2 May 1983) is a German-Turkish professional former professional footballer who played as a midfielder.

References

External links
 
 

1983 births
Living people
German people of Turkish descent
Sportspeople from Krefeld
German footballers
Footballers from North Rhine-Westphalia
Association football midfielders
Süper Lig players
3. Liga players
Denizlispor footballers
Kardemir Karabükspor footballers
Akhisarspor footballers
KFC Uerdingen 05 players
Fortuna Düsseldorf players
Sivasspor footballers
German expatriate footballers
German expatriate sportspeople in Turkey
Expatriate footballers in Turkey